Sok Siphana (born April 16, 1960) is a Cambodian lawyer.

Sok is a practicing attorney and the Principal at SokSiphana&associates (a member of ZICO Law), a law and consulting firm specialized in international trade and corporate law in Phnom Penh. He was appointed by Prime Minister Samdech Techo Hun Sen concurrently as Advisor of the Royal Government of Cambodia and Advisor to the Supreme National Economic Council with rank of Minister in August 2009 and November 2011 respectively. He also serves as the Chairman of the Board of Cambodia Development Resource Institute (CDRI), Cambodia’s oldest and prominent independent research institute.

Early life
Sok spent his adolescent life in the Killing Fields of Cambodia, before moving to the United States as a refugee in 1980. Between 1993 and 1999, Sok was a legal adviser at the United Nations Development Programme. In 1999 he was appointed vice minister of commerce in Cambodia, where he was responsible for the nation’s accession to the World Trade Organization. After Cambodia’s successful accession to the WTO in 2004, he worked as director of technical cooperation at the International Trade Centre. Siphana holds a juris doctor degree from the Widener University School of Law in 1992 and a doctoral degree in law from the Bond University School of Law in 2009.

References

External links
 Official website

1960 births
Cambodian diplomats
Cambodian lawyers
Living people